The Guns of John Moses Browning: The Remarkable Story of the Inventor Whose Firearms Changed the World is a 2021 non-fiction book by Nathan Gorenstein about the life and career of American gunsmith John Browning.

Overview 
Written by former Philadelphia Inquirer author Nathan Gorenstein, The Guns of John Moses Browning details the events of John Browning's life, his inventions, and their historical impact. The book provides information on Browning's designs, as well as relevant aspects of his biography that impacted their creation. It is the first major biography to be published on John Browning.

Reception 
The Firearm Blog called the book "a breath of fresh air", praising the book for being able to cover a "multitude of information", and went on to suggest that though the book contains a lot of technical information, it was presented in such a way that it was easy to understand. Conversely, Kirkus Reviews felt that the technical information could alienate readers, and that the book was "best suited for gun enthusiasts", as they believed that "nonspecialists may get bogged down in such technical matters as the composition of a "locked breech system."" Publishers Weekly also noted that the excessive technical detail could "overwhelm general readers", but stated that Gorenstein was still able to emphasise Browning's abilities in a way that was nonetheless simple and understandable.

Lieutenant Colonel James C. King, writing for the Small Wars Journal, stated that "an understanding of the tools of war are not complete without an appreciation of the life of John Browning, an appreciation that cannot be truly had without Nathan Gorenstein’s book."

References

External links 

2021 non-fiction books
Firearm books
American history books
Simon & Schuster books